Louis Prosper Cantener (1803- 30 March 1847, Hyères) was a French entomologist who specialized in Coleoptera and Lepidoptera.

He wrote Catalogue des Lépidoptères du département du Var. Rev. Ent. 1 (1) : 69-94 (1833) and  Histoire naturelle des Lepidopteres Rhopaloceres, ou Papillons, Diurnes, des departements des haut et Bas-Rhin, de la Moselle, de la Meurthe, et des Vosges. L. P. Cantener. Roret et Levrault. Paris. (1834-)
Louis Cantener was a Member of the Société entomologique de France.

References
Jean Lhoste (1987). Les Entomologistes français. 1750-1950. INRA Éditions : 351 p.

1803 births
1847 deaths
French lepidopterists
Coleopterists
19th-century French zoologists
Date of birth unknown